NESS-040C5 is a potent cannabinoid agonist which was developed for the treatment of glaucoma. It has reasonable selectivity for the CB2 receptor subtype, having a CB2 affinity of 0.4nM, and 25x selectivity over the related CB1 receptor.

See also 
 AB-FUBINACA
 NESS-0327
 SR-144,528

References 

Cannabinoids